The Kitāb Hurūshiyūsh is the name conventionally given to a medieval Arabic translation of Orosius's early fifth-century Historiae adversus paganos. The translation is not unique as an Andalusian translation of a Christian text into Arabic, but few others survive as they were no longer preserved once Arabic ceased to be widely read in the Iberian peninsula. In the assessment of Ann Christys, the unique manuscript of the Arabic Orosius is now 'their most important representative.'

Origins 

Both the content and the presence of Arabic words of Hispanic origin suggest that the translation was produced in al-Andalus, but the date of its origin is uncertain. Medieval historians speculated about its origin, suggesting that it was by Ḥafṣ ibn Albār, noted for his translation into Arabic of the Psalms, and associated with the court of al-Ḥakam II, but while this may not be wrong, there is no convincing evidence to support these claims.

Style 
According to Ann Christys,
the translators were obviously struggling with their material. Orosius' convoluted style was difficult to understand, and they may have been working with a corrupt version of the Histories. They took great liberties with the text, abbreviating and transposing it and sprinkling their effort with disclaimers, such as 'we have suppressed this, but through a love of conciseness and not wanting to go on at length'. They left out almost the whole of Orosius' prefaces to Books 5, 6 and 7. Some sections may have been omitted because they were incomprehensible. Others were glossed extensively. There are many spelling mistakes, particularly in the names of places and people, although some of these may be the fault of later copyists. There are many instances of muslim influence on the text, which begins with the bismillah, the opening words of the Qurʾan. The clearest example of Arabicizing is the presentation of personal names in their Arabic form X ibn Y. This necessitated the invention of names for the forgotten fathers of the heroes of antiquity. The founder of Rome became Romulus ibn Marcus ... Emperors were almost always made the son of their predecessor. Some of the biblical characters were given the forms of their names as they appear in the Qurʾan. Mount Ararat, where the Ark came to rest, was identified with Mount Judi, according to islamic belief.
A quotation from the verse of Virgil was rendered into Arabic verse. There are many additions to Orosius's material, many of which could have come from the works of Isidore of Seville, particularly his Chronicle.

Manuscript 

The text is known from one, paper manuscript, Columbia University library MS X-893 712 H, of 129 pages. The manuscript is thought to be missing a couple of pages from the beginning and its contents list shows that it is missing several pages from the end, which moreover once extended Orosius's history as far as the Umayyad conquest of Hispania in 711. The origin of the manuscript is uncertain: somewhere in Hispania or North Africa (more likely the latter), perhaps from the thirteenth or fourteenth century (again, more likely the latter). Both the translation and the surviving manuscript could have been made for either a Muslim or Christian audience: the manuscript contains both a gloss in Latin, suggesting a Christian reader, and glosses on two folios in Arabic criticising Christian belief.

Influence 
The translation was influential on Arabic historians, especially Ibn Khaldūn, who was the only Muslim historian to quote from it extensively.

Editions and translations
A Horizon 2020-funded project promised an English translation of the Kitāb Hurūshiyūsh by Marco Di Branco, to be published in 2022.
 Marco Di Branco (trans.), Ibn Ḫaldūn tra Alessandro e Cesare: la Grecia e Roma nel Libro degli esempi. (Kitāb al-ʻIbar, II 149 BĀ - 172 BĀ ed. Chabbouh) (Il Poligrafo, 2020),

References

Further reading 

 Levi Della Vida, G., 'La traduzione arabe delle storie di Orosio', Al-Andalus, 19 (1954), 257-93.
 Levi Della Vida, G., 'Un texte Mozarabe d'Histoire Universelle' in Etudes D'Orientalisme dédiées a la mémoire de Lévi-Provençal, 2 vols (Paris: Maissoneuve et Larose, 1962), I, pp. 175-83.
 Hans Daiber, 'Orosius' Historiae adversus paganos in arabischer Überlieferung', in Tradition and Re-interpretation in Jewish and Early Christian Literature: Essays in Honor of Jürgen C. H. Lebram, ed. by J. W. van Henten and others, Studia Post-Biblica, 36 (Leiden: Brill, 1986), pp. 202–49
 María Teresa Penelas, Kitāb Hurūšiyūš: traducción árabe de las "Historiae adversus paganos", Fuentes arábico-hispanas, 26 (Madrid: Consejo Superior de Investigaciones Científicas. Agencia Española de Cooperación Internacional, 2001).
 Christian Sahner, 'From Augustine to Islam: Translation and History in the Arabic Orosius', Speculum, 88.4 (2013), 905–31 

Literature of Al-Andalus
Translations into Arabic
9th-century literature